Madden Season 2 is an update to the arcade version of Madden Football by Global VR. The game engine is based on the Madden NFL console game produced by EA.

Depending on the machine the game can support 2 or 4 players.

Notable improvements over the original Madden arcade game 
Season Mode: Anyone who has a Global VR players card can play a season using the real 2006-07 season.

Training Mode: Players with a Global VR Players card run through a series of training camps to earn power ups that can be used in single and multiplayer games but not in tournaments.

Made the gameplay faster paced to accommodate the arcade market.

Team and roster updates.

External links 
Official Global VR website

2006 video games
Arcade video games
Arcade-only video games
Season 2
Video games developed in the United States